John W. Fonfara (born December 1, 1955) is an American politician serving as a member of the Connecticut State Senate for the 1st district.

Early life and education 
Fonfara was born and raised in Hartford, Connecticut and attended Hartford Public Schools. He earned a Bachelor of Arts degree in political science from the University of Connecticut and a Master of Arts in Public Policy from Trinity College.

Career 
Fonfara served as a member of the Connecticut House of Representatives from 1987 to 1997. Elected to the Connecticut State Senate in 1996, he also serves as deputy majority leader. His district includes Hartford and Wethersfield. Since 2017, Fonfara has served as co-chair of the Senate Finance, Revenue and Bonding Committee, which manages Connecticut's budget. In 2019, Fonfara proposed legislation that would establish a state commission to fund toll roads. Fonfara also serves as vice chair of the Senate General Law Committee.

On January 9, 2023, Fonfara announced his candidacy in the Hartford mayoral election, vying to succeed the retiring Luke Bronin.

References

External links
John Fonfara official website
Connecticut General Assembly - John W. Fonfara 'bills introduced
Project Vote Smart - Senator John W. Fonfara (CT) profile
Follow the Money - John W Fonfara
2006 2004 2002 2000 1998 1996 campaign contributions

Democratic Party Connecticut state senators
Democratic Party members of the Connecticut House of Representatives
1955 births
Living people
21st-century American politicians